The year 1852 in architecture involved some significant architectural events and new buildings.

Events
 February – Augustus Pugin suffers a breakdown and is admitted to a private asylum, Kensington Housea, London, days after designing the clock tower for the Palace of Westminster.
 June – Augustus Pugin is transferred to the Royal Bethlem Hospital.
 date unknown – Thomas M. Penson restores a house at 22 Eastgate Street, Chester, England, in black-and-white Revival style.

Buildings and structures

Buildings completed

 January 1 – Battle railway station, East Sussex (England), designed by William Tress, is opened.
 February 3 – The House of Commons of the United Kingdom in the Palace of Westminster, London (England) designed by Charles Barry and Augustus Pugin, is opened.
 May 15 – Teatro Comunale Alighieri in Ravenna, designed by Tommaso and Giambattista Meduna, is opened.
 October 14 – London King's Cross railway station, designed by Lewis Cubitt, is opened.
 Helsinki Cathedral, Finland, designed by Carl Ludvig Engel, is completed.
 Chapel of St Edmund's College, Ware, England, designed by Augustus Pugin in 1845, is completed.
 Rolle Mausoleum, Bicton, Devon, England, reconstructed by Augustus Pugin, is completed.
 Siegestor (Victory Gate) in Munich, Bavaria, designed by Friedrich von Gärtner, is completed by Eduard Mezger.
 Åmodt bro suspension bridge, Oslo, Norway.
 Philippi Covered Bridge, West Virginia, United States.

Awards
 RIBA Royal Gold Medal – Leo von Klenze.
 Grand Prix de Rome, architecture – P.R.L. Ginain.

Births
 June 25 – Antoni Gaudí, Catalan Modernist architect (died 1926)
 July 4 – E. S. Prior, English Arts and Crafts architect and theorist (died 1932)

Deaths
 May 7 – James Savage, English architect (born 1779; buried in his St Luke's Church, Chelsea)
 May 8 – Giuseppe Jappelli, Italian neoclassical architect and engineer (born 1783)
 July 5 – Matthew Habershon, English architect (born 1789)
 September 14 – Augustus Pugin, English architect, designer, artist and critic (born 1812; "convulsions followed by coma")

References

Architecture
Years in architecture
19th-century architecture